The Hundred of Waterhouse refers to a cadastral unit (land division). It may refer to:
 Hundred of Waterhouse (Northern Territory)
 Hundred of Waterhouse (South Australia)